The Maharashtra Vidhan Parishad or Maharashtra Legislative Council is the upper house of the bicameral legislature of Maharashtra state in western India.

Maharashtra Legislature Leaders

Party Group Leader & Chief Whip

Location
The seat of the Vidhan Parishad is situated at the Nariman Point area of South Mumbai in the capital Mumbai. The budget session and the monsoon session are convened in Mumbai whereas the winter session is convened in the auxiliary capital Nagpur.

Membership by party 
Members of Maharashtra Legislative Council by their political party:

Composition of Legislative Council
Legislative Council shall consist of not less than 40 members or maximum one-third of the total number of members in the legislative assembly, chosen in the manner provided in this section.

 30 members shall be elected by the members of the Legislative Assembly.
 7 members are elected from amongst graduates from seven divisions of Maharashtra ( Mumbai, Amravati Division, Nashik Division, Aurangabad Division, Konkan Division, Nagpur Division and Pune Division)
 7 members are elected from amongst teachers from seven divisions of Maharashtra ( Mumbai, Amravati Division, Nashik Division, Aurangabad Division, Konkan Division, Nagpur Division and Pune Division)
 22 members are elected from amongst the local bodies of Maharashtra from 21 divisions of Maharashtra ( Mumbai (2 seats) and one seat each from Ahmednagar, Akola-cum-Washim-cum-Buldhana, Amravati, Aurangabad-cum-Jalna, Bhandara- Gondiya, Dhule-cum-Nandurbar, Jalgaon, Kolhapur, Nagpur, Nanded, Nashik, Osmanabad-cum-Latur-cum-Beed, Parbhani-Hingoli, Pune, Raigad-cum-Ratnagiri-cum-Sindhudurg, Sangli-cum-Satara, Solapur, Thane-cum-Palghar, Wardha-cum-Chandrapur-cum-Gadhchiroli and Yavatmal)
 12 members having special knowledge or practical experience in respect of matters such as literature, science, art, co-operative movement and social service shall be nominated by the Governor

It is a continuous House and not subject to dissolution. However, one-third of its members retire every second year and are replaced by new members. As such a member enjoys a tenure of six years. The members of the Vidhan Parishad elect its chairman and deputy chairman.

Constituencies and Members (78)
Following are recent members of Maharashtra Legislative Council

Elected by the Legislative Assembly members (30) 
Keys:

Elected from Local Authorities' constituencies (22) 
Keys:

Elected from Teachers' constituencies (7) 
Keys:

Elected from Graduates constituencies (7) 
Keys:

Governor Nominated (12)

Officers

Chairman

Leader of the House
The council has a Leader of the House, who heads the government caucus. The office is provided for in the Legislative Council Rules, which defines it as "Chief Minister or any other Minister appointed by Chief Minister". The Rules further mandate that the chairperson should conduct parliamentary business in consultation with the Leader.

Deputy Leader of the House
The council has a Deputy Leader of the House, who heads the government caucus. The office is provided for in the Legislative Council Rules, which defines it as "Chief Minister or any other Minister appointed by Chief Minister". The Rules further mandate that the chairperson should conduct parliamentary business in consultation with the Leader.

Leader of the Opposition

See also
 List of members of the Maharashtra Legislative Council
 Government of Maharashtra
 Maharashtra Legislative Assembly
 Vidhan Parishad

References